This article lists political parties in Saint Pierre and Miquelon.
Saint Pierre and Miquelon has a multi-party system, in which some of the French political parties are active. They participate in the elections through either Saint Pierre or Miquelon lists.
At the last elections the following lists took part:
Saint Pierre and Miquelon 2000 (Saint Pierre et Miquelon 2000, related to the Socialist Party)
Future Miquelon (Miquelon Avenir, related to the Socialist Party)
Road to the Future (Cap sur l'Avenir, related to the Radical Party of the Left)
Archipelago Tomorrow (Archipel Demain, related to the Union for a Popular Movement)
Miquelon Objectives (Objectifs Miquelonnais, related to the Union for a Popular Movement)

See also
 Politics of Saint Pierre and Miquelon
 List of political parties by country

External links 
 Archipel demain
 Cap sur l'avenir
 Saint-Pierre & Miquelon Information
 Saint-Pierre & Miquelon Community website, includes political discussions

 
Saint Pierre and Miquelon
Saint Pierre and Miquelon-related lists
+Saint Pierre and Miqeulon
Saint Pierre and Miquelon